is a village located in Aso District, Kumamoto Prefecture, Japan.

As of March 2017, the village has an estimated population of 6,752 and a population density of 87 persons per km². The total area is 77.23 km².

See also
 2016 Earthquakes

References

External links

Nishihara official website 

Villages in Kumamoto Prefecture